The FuFi-1 RNA motif is a conserved RNA structure that was discovered by bioinformatics.
Such RNA "motifs" are often the first step to elucidating the biological function of a novel RNA.
FuFi-1 motif RNAs are found in Bacillota AND Fusobacteriota.

FuFi-1 RNAs are sometimes located in the vicinity of  genes that encode XRE-like proteins, an example of a helix-turn-helix structure.  However, XRE-like proteins are very common in bacteria, and therefore it is unclear that this association represents an important biological connection.  Also, while the XRE-like genes are often located nearby to the FuFi-1 RNAs, the RNAs are not positioned so that they could be consistently located in the 5' untranslated region of the genes.  Therefore, FuFi-1 RNAs likely function in trans as small RNAs.  Predicted Rho-independent transcription terminator hairpins occur on the 3' part of the FuFi-1 RNA motif, suggesting that they terminate transcripts containing the RNA motif.  These transcription terminators were predicting using the RNie program.

References

Non-coding RNA